Omega Airport  is a former military airport serving the village of Omega in the Kavango East Region of Namibia.

See also

List of airports in Namibia
Transport in Namibia

References

External links
OpenStreetMap - Omega
OurAirports - Omega
 Google Earth

Airports in Namibia